The 2012–13 Baylor Bears men's basketball team represented Baylor University in the 2012–13 NCAA Division I men's basketball season. This was head coach Scott Drew's tenth season at Baylor. The Bears competed in the Big 12 Conference and played their home games at the Ferrell Center. They finished the season 23–14, 9–9 in Big 12 play to finish in sixth place. They lost in the quarterfinals of the Big 12 tournament to Oklahoma State. They were invited to the 2013 NIT where they defeated Long Beach State, Arizona State, Providence, BYU, and Iowa enroute to become the 2013 NIT champions.

Pre-season

Departures

Recruits

Coaching

Roster
Source

Rankings

Schedule and results
Source
All times are Central

|-
! colspan=9 style="background:#004834; color:#FDBB2F;" |Exhibition

|-
! colspan=9 style="background:#004834; color:#FDBB2F;" |Regular Season

    

|-
! colspan=9 style="background:#004834; color:#FDBB2F;" |Big 12 tournament

|-
! colspan=9 style="background:#004834; color:#FDBB2F;" |NIT

References

Baylor
Baylor Bears men's basketball seasons
Baylor
National Invitation Tournament championship seasons